Osborn Site may refer to:

Osborn Site (Bloomfield, Indiana), listed on the National Register of Historic Places in Greene County, Indiana
Osborn Site (Quitman, Texas), listed on the National Register of Historic Places in Wood County, Texas